Ronnbergia campanulata is a species of plant in the family Bromeliaceae. It is endemic to Ecuador.  Its natural habitat is subtropical or tropical moist montane forests. It is threatened by habitat loss.

References

campanulata
Flora of Ecuador
Endangered plants
Taxonomy articles created by Polbot